Daulatpur may refer to:

In Bangladesh
Daulatpur Thana, Khulna in Khulna district, in Khulna division
Daulatpur Union, a union within Fatikchhari Upazila in Chittagong
Daulatpur Upazila, Kushtia in Kushtia district, in Khulna division
Daulatpur Upazila in Manikganj district
Daulatpur, Manikganj, a town in Daulatpur Upazila, Manikganj, well known for being the site of the: 
Daulatpur-Salturia Tornado in 1989, the world's deadliest tornado

In India
Daulatpur, Punjab, a census town in Punjab
Daulatpur, Bishnupur, a census town in West Bengal
Daulatpur, Himachal Pradesh, a nagar panchayat in Himachal Pradesh
Daulatpur, Kapurthala, a village in Kapurthala district of Punjab State, India
Daulatpur, SBS Nagar, a village in Shaheed Bhagat Singh Nagar district of Punjab State, India
Daulatpur, Jaisinghpur, Sultanpur, a village in Sultanpur district, Uttar Pradesh
Daulatpur, Kadipur, a village in Sultanpur district, Uttar Pradesh

In Nepal
Daulatpur, Bheri, a Village Development Committee in Bheri Zone
Daulatpur, Sagarmatha, a Village Development Committee in Sagarmatha Zone

In Pakistan
Daulatpur, Jhelum, a village and Union Council in Jhelum District, Pakistan
Daulatpur, Sindh, a town in Sindh, Pakistan

See also 
Daulatpur Upazila (disambiguation)